Oligacanthorhynchus is a genus of parasitic worms belonging to the family Oligacanthorhynchidae.

The species of this genus are found in America.

Species:

Oligacanthorhynchus aenigma 
Oligacanthorhynchus atratus 
Oligacanthorhynchus bangalorensis

References

Archiacanthocephala
Acanthocephala genera